The Hyderabad Multi-Modal Transport System, commonly abbreviated as MMTS, is a suburban rail system in Hyderabad, India. A joint venture of the Government of Telangana and the South Central Railway, it is operated by the latter. The  system operates on three main routes: Hyderabad–Falaknuma, Hyderabad–Lingampalli and Falaknuma–Lingampalli with a total of 120 MMTS services. Currently 86 MMTS services are being operated due to the effect of COVID-19.

History
The Hyderabad MMTS project has been conceived as a joint venture between the Government of India and the Government of United Andhra Pradesh with a MoU signed in September 2000. The first phase was opened to the public on 9 August 2003 by then Deputy Prime Minister of India L.K. Advani. The planning and commencement of the work was inaugurated by the then Chief Minister of United Andhra Pradesh N.Chandrababu Naidu. The system initially consisted of three lines, with total length of 44 kilometres (27 mi). In May 2010, Indian Railways decided to take over the 104 kilometre (65 mi) as part of the Phase II at an estimated cost of ₹ 641 crore. The Railway Board cleared the approval of the second phase after the state government agreed to fund two-thirds of the project cost, which is currently under construction.

Phase I 
The first phase was completed at a cost of ₹1.62 billion (US$22 million), and it was inaugurated on 9 August 2003 by Deputy Prime Minister of India L. K. Advani. The project complements the city's rapid growth in information technology, biotechnology, health, aviation and tourism. This phase was completed in two streams, the first stream of MMTS between Hyderabad, Lingampalli and Secunderabad with a distance of  covering 17 stations. The network also consists of the coverage of other areas such as Bolarum towards Manoharabad and Umdanagar which is not completely Integrated into the MMTS network. Although many other routes and stations were available, the process of electrification of these other routes were included in the Phase II.

Phase II
The Hyderabad Metropolitan Development Authority (HMDA) has planned for the development and expansion of the MMTS to all Hyderabad rail routes in its Master Plan 2041. In May 2010, Indian Railways decided to adopt the MMTS'  Phase II project at an estimated cost of  641 crore. The Railway Board approved Phase II after the state government agreed to fund two-thirds of its cost. It was expected to be completed by 2018, and will handle 300,000 passengers a day. A  stretch from Lingampally to R. C. Puram and a  stretch from Bolaram to Medchal was scheduled to begin in March 2018, and the  Moula Ali–Ghatkesar stretch was scheduled to open in July 2018 but it was delayed due to several reasons. Regardless of the delay trial runs started on few sections of phase 2 in August 2020. Quadrupling 4 lines with electrification and installation of Automatic block signaling in the existing double line between Ghatkesar and Moula Ali, doubling & electrification between Falaknuma and Umdanagar in the southern part of city; Doubling and electrification between Moula Ali and Sitafalmandi, connecting Malkajgiri and doubling with electrification between Moula Ali and Sanathnagar along with construction of 5 new stations in the section for providing east-west connectivity bypassing Secunderabad station.

The Phase II was stalled for over a decade owing to lack of funds. The Union Government allocated ₹ 600 crore as part of the Union budget (2023-24) towards it for resumption of phase II works. Over time, the sanctioned cost has been escalated to ₹ 1,150 crores.

Segments 
 Secunderabad–Bolarum–Medchal: 
 Falaknuma–Umdanagar–Shamshabad Airport: 
 Secunderabad–Moulali–Ghatkesar: 
 Moulali–Sanathnagar chord line 
 Kacheguda–Sitaphalmandi–Malkajgiri–Moulali chord line

Stations under construction: 
 Moula Ali HB Colony
 Neredmet
 Bhudevi Nagar (Alwal)
Suchitra Center
 Ferozguda

Stations

Lines

SUBURBAN Route

Current
The Hyderbad MMTS currently operates in 3 major lines.

Major Lines
HF Line
HL Line
FL Line

Minor Lines
SF Line

Upcoming

Major Lines
SB Line

Milestones

 On International Women's Day 2012, S. Satyavati was South Central Railway's first female driver, when she drove the MMTS Matrubhumi Ladies Special Train from Falaknuma to Lingampally. 
 HYLITES (Hyderabad Live Train Enquiry System), a mobile app for MMTS station and train inquiries, was introduced.
UTS stands for Unreserved Ticketing System. It is an app launched by Indian Railways’ subsidiary body CRIS in 2014 to generate or cancel unreserved train tickets, book seasonal tickets, renew passes, and purchase platform tickets. The initiative saves passengers from getting into long queues to take Printed Card Tickets (PCTs) for local train travel or platform visits

Notes

See also

 Mumbai Suburban Railway
 Hyderabad Metro
 Bengaluru Commuter Rail

References

External links

MMTS train timings

Transport in Hyderabad, India
Secunderabad railway division
2003 establishments in Andhra Pradesh
Rail transport in Telangana
 
Transport in Secunderabad